The Union of San Marino Workers (USL) is a general union in San Marino.

The union was established in 2008.  It is a unitary organisation, with three sectors: public employment, services and commerce, and industry and crafts.  It chose not to affiliate to any national federation, but in 2019, it did affiliate to the European Trade Union Confederation.

External links

References

Trade unions established in 2008
Trade unions in San Marino